The Wedding, also known as The Wedding Day and The Wedding Day 2, is a 2021 Polish dark comedy film directed by Wojciech Smarzowski.

Cast 
 Robert Więckiewicz as Rysiek Wilk
 Agata Kulesza as Ela Wilk
 Michalina Łabacz as Kasia Wilk
 Przemysław Przestrzelski as Janek Sczuczyński
 Agata Turkot as Lea
 Arkadiusz Jakubik as Wodzirej / Wardoń
 Andrzej Chyra as Bogdan / Głowacki
 Maria Sobocińska as Inka
 Henryk Gołębiewski as Banaś / Furman
 Ryszard Ronczewski as Antoni Wilk
 Mateusz Więcławek as the young Antoni Wilk 
 Robert Wabich as Zajdel
 Sebastian Stegmann as Hermann Schmidt

Production 
The Wedding is a follow up to Smarzowski's 2004 film by the same name. Filming took place in Poland and Latvia between July and December 2020.

Release 
The Wedding was released on 8 October 2021. It performed well on its opening weekend, selling 139,536 tickets and per Film New Europe had the "best opening for a local production in 2021."

Reception 

In a praising critique of the film published by Kino Mania, Giuseppe Sedia noted that Smarzowski "invited to banquet on the big screen the same old sampler of vulgarians, bribable clerics and small town grandstanders. Subtleties aside, the Pieter Bruegel of Polish cinema offers once more a caricatural but clear-cut depiction of provincial Poland, dissolute, immobile and greedy as usual".

Screen Anarchy reviewed the film, writing "For the recurring didacticism and programmatic disruption of nationalistic self-image, The Wedding Day is an uncomfortable history revision delivered in a masterful and provocative high-wire act of genre, commercial and arthouse filmmaking of intense social relevance."

References

External links

The Wedding at Film Polski (link in Polish)

Polish black comedy films
Films about weddings
2021 black comedy films
2020s Polish-language films